The 2019 Samoa National League is the 29th edition of the Samoa National League, the top association football league of Samoa organised by the Football Federation Samoa. This season will kick off on September 14, and will be competed by 12 teams from the island of Upolu.

Teams
Team changes from the previous season:
Fa'atoia United and Sogi were promoted from the Samoa First Division to the Samoa National League.
Adidas were relegated from the Samoa National League to the Samoa First Division.
Vaimoso were excluded from the Samoa National League. 

All teams and leagues are for the 2019/20 season

League table
The league was initially postponed because of state of emergency declared by government on 16 November 2019 due to a measles outbreak; After a meeting between Football Federation Samoa and teams representants, Lupe ole Soaga were declared champions.

References

Samoa National League seasons
Samoa
National League